Harmony Grove School District may refer to:

 Harmony Grove School District (Ouachita County, Arkansas) - Near Camden
 Harmony Grove School District (Saline County, Arkansas)